The Battle at Khore was fought between the Kalhora tribe and the Mughal Empire in approximately 1699 AD in the village of Khore. Today, that village is known as Torre, and it lies on the Nai Gaj, an ephemeral river, near Johi Taluka in Dadu District, Sindh, Pakistan. Prince Muhammad Mu'izuddin, the then-governor of Multan and Lahore, came from Lahore and attacked Sindh. Mian Deen Muhammad Kalhoro, who had succeeded his father Mian Naseer Muhammad Kalhoro in 1692 AD, wanted to compromise and surrender, but his younger brother, Mian Yar Muhammad Kalhoro, refused, leading to a battle. The Mughal army was commanded by Gaj Singh Bhatti, Raja Surajmal Udhepuri, and Raja Udhey Singh (who died over the course of the battle). However, the Mughal army defeated the Kalhora force.

References 

History of South Asia by country
History of Sindh
Kalhora dynasty
Dadu District
Khore